This page lists Japan-related articles with romanized titles beginning with the letter N. For names of people, please list by surname (i.e., "Tarō Yamada" should be listed under "Y", not "T"). Please also ignore particles (e.g. "a", "an", "the") when listing articles (i.e., "A City with No People" should be listed under "City").

Na
Nabari, Mie
Nabemono
Nachikatsuura, Wakayama
Nadasaki, Okayama
Nadia: The Secret of Blue Water
Naga District, Mie
Naga District, Wakayama
Naga, Wakayama
Nagahama, Ehime
Nagahama, Shiga
Nagai, Yamagata
Go Nagai
Nagai Kafu
Nagaizumi, Shizuoka
Nagako
Nagakura Shinpachi
Nagakute, Aichi
Nagano, Nagano
Nagano Prefecture
Nagano Shinkansen
Nagaoka, Niigata
Nagaoka District, Kōchi
Nagaokakyō
Nagaokakyō, Kyoto
Nagareyama, Chiba
Nagasaki Prefecture
Nagasaki, Nagasaki
Masahiko Nagasawa
Miki Nagasawa
Masatoshi Nagase
Nagashima
Nagashima, Kagoshima
Nagashima Island, Kagoshima
Nagashima, Mie
Shigeo Nagashima
Nagashino Castle
Nagasu, Kumamoto
Nagatachō, Tokyo
Nagato, Yamaguchi
Nagato Province
Nagatsuka Takashi
Yōko Nagayama
Nagi, Okayama
Naginata
Naginatajutsu
Nago, Okinawa
Nagoya
Nagoya Airport
Nagoya Castle
Nagoya Grampus Eight
Nagoya Line (Kintetsu)
Nagoya Station
Nagoya, Saga
Chuichi Nagumo
Naha, Okinawa
Nahari, Kōchi
Nairan
Naito Torajiro
Naka, Hyogo
Naka District, Shimane
Naka District, Tokushima
Yuji Naka
Nakabaru, Saga
Nakae Chomin
Nakagami District, Okinawa
Nakagawa, Tokushima
Nakagawa Hidemasa
Nakagawa, Fukuoka
Nakagusuku Bay
Nakagusuku, Okinawa
Nakahama Manjiro
Chūya Nakahara
Nakahechi, Wakayama
Nakajima, Ehime
Nakajima, Fukushima
Nakajima, Ishikawa
Nakajima Aircraft Company
Nakajima Atsushi
Nakajima B5N
Nakajima B6N
Nakajima G10N
Nakajima Ki-115
Nakajima Ki-116
Nakajima Ki-201
Nakajima Ki-43
Nakajima Kikka
Nakakawane, Shizuoka
Nakama, Fukuoka
Yoshiro Nakamatsu
Nakamichi
Suzuka Nakamoto
Nakamura, Kochi
Masato Nakamura
Nakane Chie
Hiroyuki Nakano
Nakano Station (Tokyo)
Nakano, Nagano
Nakano, Tokyo
Nakasendō
Nakashima District, Aichi
Yasuhiro Nakasone
Hideo Nakata
Hidetoshi Nakata
Nakatado District, Kagawa
Nakatane, Kagoshima
Nakatosa, Kōchi
Nakatsu, Ōita
Nakatsu, Wakayama
Nakatsu Station (Hankyu)
Nakatsu Station (Osaka Municipal Subway)
Nakatsue, Ōita
Nakatsugaru District, Aomori
Nakatsugawa, Gifu
Nakatsukasa
Nakayama, Ehime
Nakayama, Tottori
Nakayama, Yamagata
Nakayama-dera
Nakijin, Okinawa
Nakiri bocho
Namba
Namba Station
Namboku Line (Osaka)
Namboku Line (Kobe)
Namboku Line (Sapporo)
Nanboku Line (Sendai)
Chūhei Nambu
NAMC YS-11
Namco
Namek
Namerikawa, Toyama
Namie Amuro
Namikata, Ehime
Namino, Kumamoto
Nanakusa-no-sekku
Nanao, Ishikawa
Nanayama, Saga
Nanboku-chō period
Nandan, Hyogo
Nangō, Miyagi
Nangō, Miyazaki (Higashiusuki)
Nangō, Miyazaki (Minaminaka)
Naniwa-ku, Osaka
Nankai Electric Railway
Nankan, Kumamoto
Nanking Massacre
Nanko, Hyogo
Nankoku, Kōchi
Nansei, Mie
Nanto, Mie
Nanto, Toyama
Nan'yō, Yamagata
Naokawa, Ōita
Naoiri, Ōita
Naoiri District, Ōita
Naoshima, Kagawa
Nara, Nara
Nara Line (Kintetsu)
Nara period
Nara Prefecture
Naraku
Narashino, Chiba
Narita International Airport
Narita, Chiba
Narita-san
Nariwa, Okayama
Naruhito
Naruko, Miyagi
Naruto
Naruto jutsu
Naruto, Tokushima
National (brand)
National Defense Academy of Japan
National Diet Library
National Police Agency
National Public Safety Commission
Natori, Miyagi
Natsume Sōseki
Nattō
Nausicaä of the Valley of the Wind (film)
Nausicaä of the Valley of the Wind (manga)
Nawa, Tottori
Nayoro, Hokkaidō
Naze Nani Nadesico
Naze, Kagoshima

Ne
NEC
NEC Earth Simulator
Negima!: Magister Negi Magi
Nejime, Kagoshima
Nekketsu Kōha Kunio-kun
 Nemophila
Nemuro, Hokkaidō
Nemuro Peninsula
Nemuro Strait
Nemuro Subprefecture
Neo Geo (console)
Neo Geo CD
Neo Geo Pocket
Neo Geo Pocket Color
Neon Genesis Evangelion
Nerima, Tokyo
NES 2
Netsuke
New Beginning
New Central Airlines
New Chitose Airport
New Frontier Party
New Komeito Party
New Conservative Party
New Party Sakigake
New Zealand Story
Newtype
Michiko Neya
Neyagawa, Osaka
NHK

Ni
Niboshi
Nichihara, Shimane
Nichinan, Miyazaki
Nichinan, Tottori
Nichiren
Nichiren Buddhism
Nichiren Shōshū
Nichiren Shu
Nights into Dreams...
Nihon Keizai Shimbun
Nihon-shiki Rōmaji
Nihonmatsu, Fukushima
Nihon Ki-in
Nihon Shoki
Nihon University
Niigata Prefecture
Niigata University
Niigata, Niigata
Niihama, Ehime
Niimi Nankichi
Niimi, Okayama
Niitsu, Niigata
Niiza, Saitama
Nijō Castle
Nijō, Fukuoka
Miho Nikaido
Nikkatsu
Nikkei 225
Nikkō, Tochigi
Nikkō (priest)
Nikolai of Japan
Nikon
Nikon F
Nima District, Shimane
Nima, Shimane
Ningen-sengen
Ninja
Ninja Gaiden
Ninja in popular culture
Ninjaken
Ninjutsu
Ninohe, Iwate
Ninomiya Sontoku
Ninomiya, Kanagawa
Ninomiya, Tochigi
Nintendo
Nintendo 64
Nintendo DS
Nintendo Entertainment System
Nintendo Family Computer
Nintendo GameCube
Nintendo Seal of Quality
Nintendo Virtual Boy
Nio, Kagawa
Nippon Budokan
Nippon Cargo Airlines
Nippon Professional Baseball
Nippon Sei Ko Kai
Nippon Telegraph and Telephone
Nippon Television
Nippon Yusen
Nipponbashi
Nirasaki, Yamanashi
Nirayama, Shizuoka
Nisei
Nishi-tokyo, Tokyo
Nishiarita, Saga
Nishiawakura, Okayama
Nishiazai, Shiga
Nishibiwajima, Aichi
Nishida Kitaro
Nishigoshi, Kumamoto
Nishihara, Kumamoto
Nishihara, Okinawa
Nishiharu, Aichi
Nishiiyayama, Tokushima
Nishiizu, Shizuoka
Nishikamo District, Aichi
Nishikasugai District, Aichi
Miwa Nishikawa
Takahiro Nishikawa
Takanori Nishikawa
Nishiki, Akita
Nishiki, Kumamoto
Nishiki, Yamaguchi
Nishiki-e
Nishikunisaki District, Ōita
Nishimatsuura District, Saga
Nishimera, Miyazaki
Nishimorokata District, Miyazaki
Hiroyuki Nishimura
Nishimuro District, Wakayama
Nishinippon Shimbun
Nishinomiya, Hyogo
Nishinoomote, Kagoshima
Nishinoshima, Shimane
Nishio, Aichi
Ishin Nishio
Satoru Nishita
Nishitama, Tokyo
Nishitosa, Kochi
Nishiumi, Ehime
Nishiusuki District, Miyazaki
Nishiuwa District, Ehime
Nishiwaki, Hyogo
Nishiyoshino, Nara
Nismo
Nissan
Nissan 200SX
Nissan Fairlady
Nissan Frontier
Nissan Maxima
Nissan Mutual Life Insurance
Nissan Pathfinder
Nissan S30
Nissan Skyline GT-R
Nissan Z-car
Nisshin, Aichi
Nissin Foods
Nita District, Shimane
Nita, Shimane
Nitto Records
Niwa District, Aichi
Niyodo, Kōchi

No
Nobeoka, Miyazaki
Noboribetsu, Hokkaidō
Noda Castle
Junko Noda
Noda, Kagoshima
Noda, Chiba
Nodachi
Nodagawa, Kyoto
Nōgata, Fukuoka
Nogi District, Shimane
Hideyo Noguchi
Isamu Noguchi
Noguchi Museum
Noh
Noichi, Kōchi
Noir (anime)
Nojiri, Miyazaki
Nokami, Wakayama
Nōmi, Hiroshima
Hideo Nomo
Nomura Group
Yoshitaro Nomura
Nomura, Ehime
Nonogram
North Korean abductions of Japanese
Northern Fujiwara
Nori
Noriko Hidaka
Nose, Osaka
Nosegawa, Nara
Noshiro, Akita
Noto Peninsula
Noto Province
Notogawa, Shiga
Notsu, Ōita
Notsuharu, Ōita
Nozomi (probe)
Nozomi (train)
Nozomi Witches

Nt
NTT DoCoMo

Nu
Nue
Nukata District, Aichi
Nukata, Aichi
Nukekubi
Numakuma District, Hiroshima
Numakuma, Hiroshima
Numata, Gunma
Numazu, Shizuoka
Nunchaku

Ny
Nyoi-bo
Nyūkawa, Gifu

N